Gathorne Gathorne-Hardy, 5th Earl of Cranbrook,  (born 20 June 1933), styled Lord Medway until 1978, is a British zoologist, biologist, naturalist, and peer. Since 1956, he has been active in the fields of ornithology, mammalogy, and zooarchaeology, and has influenced research and education in Southeast Asia. His career focus was on the tiny birds that build edible nests.

Cranbrook was born in St George Hanover Square, the eldest child of John Gathorne-Hardy, 4th Earl of Cranbrook, also a zoologist, and his second wife, Fidelity Seebohm, daughter of Hugh Exton Seebohm and sister of Lord Seebohm. He was educated at Eton College and Corpus Christi College, Cambridge. He earned his PhD in 1960 from the University of Birmingham.

A tropical biologist, Cranbrook worked in Malaya for three years before taking up residence at his family seat, Great Glemham House, Great Glemham, Saxmundham, Suffolk.

He succeeded as Earl of Cranbrook upon his father's death in 1978, and sat as a Conservative peer in the House of Lords. He left the Lords in November 1999 as a result of the House of Lords Act 1999; he was not a candidate to retain a place in the House as an elected hereditary peer.

A species of white-toothed shrew, Gathorne's shrew (Crocidura gathornei) is named in his honor.

Marriage and issue
On 9 May 1967, he married Caroline Jarvis.
Cranbrook and his wife have three children: 
John Jason Gathorne-Hardy, Lord Medway (born 26 October 1968), heir apparent to the earldom, born in Kuala Lumpur
Dr. Lady Flora Gathorne-Hardy (born 10 October 1971)
Hon. Argus Edward Gathorne-Hardy (born 28 May 1973)

References

External links

1933 births
Living people
People from Westminster
20th-century British zoologists
British biologists
People educated at Eton College
Earls in the Peerage of the United Kingdom
Fellows of the Linnean Society of London
Fellows of the Zoological Society of London
Fellows of the Royal Geographical Society
Fellows of the Royal Society of Biology
Alumni of Corpus Christi College, Cambridge
Alumni of the University of Birmingham
Scientists from London
Gathorne-Hardy family

Cranbrook